The 1997–98 Kentucky Wildcats men's basketball team were coached by Tubby Smith. He was in his first season as head coach after taking over from Rick Pitino. The team finished the season with a 29–4 record and won the NCAA Men's Division I Basketball Championship over the Utah Utes, 78–69.

Roster

Depth chart

Schedule

November
The Tubby Smith-era officially began on November 18 with an 88 to 49 victory over Morehead State at Rupp Arena.  Allen Edwards added 15 points, Wayne Turner had 12 points and Heshimu Evans had 10 points. Four days later Kentucky traveled to island of Maui to compete in the annual Maui Invitational Tournament, Kentucky defeated George Washington 70 to 55 in the first round of the tournament. The victory over the Colonials set up a game the next night in the semifinals against No. 1 Arizona, a rematch of the 1997 NCAA tournament championship Game.  Kentucky experienced its first loss of the season with a 74 to 89 set back. After the loss the Wildcats rebounded the next night in the 3rd-place game against Missouri with a 77 to 55 victory.  After Kentucky left Maui they traveled to Phoenix three days later to defeat No. 13 Clemson 76 to 61.  Kentucky finished November ranked No. 7 in the AP poll and with a 4–1 record.

December
On December 3 Kentucky defeated No. 6 Purdue 89 to 75 in the annual Great Eight Classic in Chicago. Nazr Mohammed carried Kentucky with 19 points on 8-10 field goal shooting. Three days later Kentucky traveled to Indianapolis to defeat rival Indiana 75 to 72.  Nazr Mohammed and Jeff Sheppard led the way with 21 points a piece. Four days later Kentucky traveled to Buffalo to defeat Canisius 81 to 54.  On December 13 the Wildcats played its first home game in 23 days against No. 24 Georgia Tech.  They defeated the Yellow Jackets 85 to 71 behind 14 points and 10 rebounds by Heshimu Evans. One week later Kentucky defeated Tubby Smith's former school Tulsa 74 to 53. Three nights later Kentucky defeated American 75 to 52.  Four days later Kentucky played in-state rival Louisville in the annual Battle for the Bluegrass.  Kentucky was upset by the Cardinals 76 to 79 due in part to the Wildcats shooting 5 for 23 from the 3 point line. Three nights later the Wildcats bounced back on the road in Athens, OH with a 95 to 58 victory over Ohio. Kentucky finished the 1997 calendar year with a 11-2 record and ranked 6th in the AP poll.

January

February

March

Results

|-
!colspan=12 style="background:#005DAA; color:white;"| Exhibition

|-
!colspan=12 style="background:#005DAA; color:white;"| Non-conference regular season

|-
!colspan=12 style="background:#005DAA; color:white;"| SEC Tournament

|-
!colspan=12 style="text-align: center; background:#005DAA"|NCAA tournament

Team players drafted into the NBA

See also
Kentucky Wildcats men's basketball
1998 NCAA Division I men's basketball tournament

References

External links
 1998 NCAA Basketball National Championship Utah vs Kentucky

Kentucky
Kentucky Wildcats men's basketball seasons
NCAA Division I men's basketball tournament championship seasons
NCAA Division I men's basketball tournament Final Four seasons
Kentucky
Wild
Wild